Zombi Child is a 2019 French drama film directed by Bertrand Bonello. It is based on the account of the life of a supposed zombified man in Haiti, Clairvius Narcisse. It was screened in the Directors' Fortnight section at the 2019 Cannes Film Festival.

Plot
In 1962, a Haitian man is buried alive by white colonists, only to be brought back as an undead zombi slave. 55 years later, a teenage girl Fanny makes friends with Mélissa, who moved from Haiti to France after the 2010 Haiti earthquake. After it is revealed that Mélissa's family is associated with voodoo culture, Fanny convinces Mélissa's aunt Katy (a mambo) to perform a ritual in order to cure Fanny's heartbreak over a recent breakup. The ritual goes awry, however, leaving Fanny possessed by Baron Samedi himself.

Cast

Release
The film had its world premiere in the Directors' Fortnight section at the 2019 Cannes Film Festival on 17 May 2019. It was released in France on 12 June 2019.

Reception

Critical response
The website's critical consensus reads, "If the strain of its ambitious juggling act sometimes shows, Zombi Child remains an entertainingly audacious experience, enlivened with thought-provoking themes." On Metacritic, which assigns a normalized rating, the film has a score 74 out of 100, based on 13 critics, indicating "generally favorable reviews".

References

External links
 

2019 films
2019 drama films
2010s French-language films
2010s fantasy drama films
French fantasy drama films
Films directed by Bertrand Bonello
Films with screenplays by Bertrand Bonello
Films about Voodoo
2010s French films